Frank Baumbauer (born 2 September 1945 in Munich, Germany) is a German theater director and artistic director active in the German theater community. He is the son of German casting agent  Erna Baumbauer. Baumbauer was from 2001 to 2009 the director of the Munich Kammerspiele.

References

External links

1945 births
German theatre directors
Theatre people from Munich
Living people